Thomas Wayne Jenkins (born December 14, 1947) is an American professional golfer.

Born in Houston, Texas, Jenkins attended the University of Houston, where he was a member of the NCAA University Division championship team in 1970, led by John Mahaffey. He graduated in 1971 and turned professional. His sole PGA Tour victory was the IVB-Philadelphia Golf Classic in 1975, with the final two rounds played  With seven wins in his eleven years and more than $12 million in prize money, Jenkins is currently in the top-10 on the all time money list for the PGA Tour Champions.

Prior to joining the senior tour, Jenkins was the lead instructor for several years at Dave Pelz's short game schools.

Professional wins (8)

PGA Tour wins (1)

PGA Tour playoff record (0–1)

Champions Tour wins (7)

*Note: The 2006 SAS Championship was shortened to 36 holes due to rain.

Champions Tour playoff record (2–4)

See also 

 1972 PGA Tour Qualifying School graduates

References

External links

American male golfers
Houston Cougars men's golfers
PGA Tour golfers
PGA Tour Champions golfers
Golfers from Austin, Texas
Golfers from Houston
1947 births
Living people